Ansina is a town in the Tacuarembó Department of northern-central Uruguay.

Geography
The town is located on the junction of Route 26 with Route 44, on the east bank of Tacuarembó River.

History

On 5 October 1950, the populated nucleus known as "Paso de Borracho" was renamed to "Ansina" and its status was elevated to "Pueblo" (village) by the Act of Ley Nº 11.530, and then on 3 May 1984, to "Villa" (town) by the Act of Ley Nº 15.539.

Population
In 2011 Ansina had a population of 2,712.
 
Source: Instituto Nacional de Estadística de Uruguay

Places of worship
 Our Lady of Itatí Parish Church, a Roman Catholic pilgrimage sanctuary

References

External links
INE map of Ansina

Populated places in the Tacuarembó Department